The 2017 SWAC men's basketball tournament was the postseason men's basketball tournament for the Southwestern Athletic Conference. Tournament first-round games were played at the campus of the higher seeded team on March 7. The remainder of the tournament was held on March 10 and 11, 2017 at the Toyota Center in Houston, Texas. Texas Southern, received the conference's automatic bid to the NCAA tournament. Alcorn State lost to Texas Southern in the championship game, but was ineligible for NCAA postseason play due to APR violations. Had Alcorn State beaten Texas Southern, Texas Southern would have still received the conference's automatic bid to the NCAA Tournament because of its first place finish in the regular season.

Seeds

The top eight teams competed in the conference tournament. Teams were seeded by record within the conference, with a tiebreaker system to seed teams with identical conference records.

Schedule and results

Bracket

First round games at campus sites of lower-numbered seeds

References

SWAC men's basketball tournament
2016–17 Southwestern Athletic Conference men's basketball season